Satyrium edwardsii, the Edwards' hairstreak, is a species of butterfly in the family Lycaenidae. It is found in the eastern parts of the United States and in the southern parts of the Canadian provinces from Saskatchewan to Quebec.

Larvae feed on Quercus species, including Q. ilicifolia

The Edward's hairstreak is an endangered species, and one of the places to find them is at Adams Lake, Ohio, in the prairie area.

References

R. P. Webster and M. C. Nielsen (1984). Myrmecophily in the Edward's hairstreak butterfly Satyrium edwardsii (Lycaenidae). Journal of the Lepidopterists' Society 38(2):124–133.

Butterflies of North America
Satyrium (butterfly)
Taxa named by Augustus Radcliffe Grote
Taxa named by Coleman Townsend Robinson
Butterflies described in 1867